Kudchade railway station (station code: SVM) is a small railway station in South Goa district, Goa. This railway station is also known as Curchorem as well as Sanvordem station. It serves Curchorem town. The station consists of 1 platform. The platform is not well sheltered. It lacks many facilities including water and sanitation. The railway line from Marmagoa to Londa passes through Curchorem.

History
This line was laid in 1880. A Catholic carpenter, Tome Caetano de Costa from aldona, Bardez, was entrusted with laying of the railway line and construction of Curchorem-Sanvordem railway station. One of the main contractors of the rail line from Marmagoa to Collem was Mr. Cosme Damiao Noronha and his subcontractor was Tome Caetano de Costa. Curchorem-Sanvordem was covered with thick forests and wild animals, so that people used to think that Sanvordem formed an outer limit of Goa. The Portuguese government asked the British government to start the railway line. This was the most difficult task as hills had to be cut down, tunnels dug and thick forest cleared.

Major trains 

 Vasco da Gama–Kulem Passenger
 Vasco–Chennai Express
 Poorna Express
 Yesvantpur–Vasco da Gama Express
 Vasco da Gama - Yesvantpur Express
 Amaravati Express
 Vasco da Gama–Kacheguda Amaravati Express
 Hubballi–Vasco da Gama Goa Link Express
 Kacheguda–Vasco da Gama Express
 Tirupati–Vasco da Gama Express
 Hyderabad–Vasco da Gama Express
 Goa Express

Vasco da Gama - Velankanni Weekly Express
Vasco da Gama Jasidih Weekly Express
Kulem- Vasco da Gama Demu Special ↔️
Vasco da Gama Yesvantpur Express

References

Hubli railway division
Railway stations in South Goa district